Sistani may refer to:
Sistan, a historical and geographical region in eastern Iran
Sistani Persian people, who mainly inhabit Iran, Afghanistan and Pakistan
Sistani Language
Sistani (surname)
Sistani Mahalleh, a village in Iran
Tolombeh-ye Habib Sistani, a village in Iran
Vahdapar va Arbandi Sistani, a village in Iran